Pierre Lewden (21 February 1901 – 30 April 1989) was a French high jumper who competed at the 1920, 1924 and 1928 Olympics. He won a bronze medal in 1924 and finished in seventh place in 1920 and 1928. Despite his short statue (1.67 m) Lewden was ranked #1–2 in Europe and #3–9 in the world in 1921–1925.

References

1901 births
1989 deaths
People from Libourne
French male high jumpers
Athletes (track and field) at the 1920 Summer Olympics
Athletes (track and field) at the 1924 Summer Olympics
Athletes (track and field) at the 1928 Summer Olympics
Olympic athletes of France
Olympic bronze medalists for France
Medalists at the 1924 Summer Olympics
Olympic bronze medalists in athletics (track and field)
Sportspeople from Gironde
20th-century French people